My Religion may refer to:

My Religion (album), an album by TNT
"My Religion" (song), a song by Ryan Starr
Light in My Darkness, a book by Helen Keller originally published as My Religion
What I Believe, a book by Leo Tolstoy also known as My Religion